Maksim Valadzko (born 10 November 1992) is a Belarusian professional footballer who plays for FC Santa Coloma.

Club career
On 12 January 2019, he signed with the Russian Premier League club FC Arsenal Tula. He made his debut for Arsenal on 4 May 2019 in a game against FC Lokomotiv Moscow as a 76th-minute substitute for Luka Đorđević. He left Arsenal on 31 July 2020.

On 14 October 2020 he joined FC Tambov.

International
Maksim Valadzko made his debut for the senior national side of his country on 18 November 2014, in the 3:2 home win over Mexico in a friendly match, playing 76 minutes.

Honours
BATE Borisov
Belarusian Premier League champion: 2009, 2011, 2013, 2014, 2015, 2016, 2017, 2018
Belarusian Cup winner: 2014–15, 2020–21
Belarusian Super Cup winner: 2013, 2014, 2015, 2016, 2017, 2022

International goals
Scores and results list Belarus' goal tally first.

References

External links
 
 

1992 births
Living people
Footballers from Minsk
Belarusian footballers
Association football defenders
Belarus international footballers
Belarusian expatriate footballers
Expatriate footballers in Russia
Expatriate footballers in Andorra
Russian Premier League players
FC BATE Borisov players
FC SKVICH Minsk players
FC Arsenal Tula players
FC Tambov players
FC Santa Coloma players